Peachtree Ridge High School (PRHS) is a public high school in Gwinnett County, in Suwanee, Georgia, United States. It is a part of Gwinnett County Public Schools. It is one of two public schools in the county to use block scheduling, the other being Shiloh High School.

History
Peachtree Ridge High School is located on Old Peachtree Road.  It is located on land which belonged to the heirs of Eugene Baynes.  A lake behind the school is named Lake Louella after Mrs. Louise Ella Baynes, as is Lake Louella Road near the school. A few hundred yards from the school is the Goodwin home, which was built in 1823 and is the oldest building in Suwanee.

Construction of the  school's main facility commenced in March 2001.  PRHS was constructed to relieve overcrowding at four neighboring high schools.  When its doors opened for the 2003–2004 academic year, almost all of the sophomores, juniors, and seniors came from either Duluth High School in Duluth, Collins Hill High School in Suwanee, or North Gwinnett High School in Suwanee.

The school officially opened for classes on Monday, August 11, 2003, with enrollment topping 1,900 students. By November of the same year, another  of athletic facilities (field house) were nearing completion.

Clubs

Robotics
Peachtree Ridge High School Robotics (Team 1261 Robo Lions) was established in the 2003–2004 school year.

Team 1261's main platform is the FIRST Robotics Competition, which takes place during the spring semester. Since 2004, the team has won four regional events and numerous other awards for design efficiency, creativity, and performance.

In the 2014 season the Peachtree Ridge High School Robotics team won the Palmetto Regional, becoming the first Georgia team to win a regional.

2006 Governor's Cup
In 2006 Peachtree Ridge was awarded the Governor's Cup for the most improvement in SAT scores for AAAAA schools in the county. Georgia governor Sonny Perdue visited the school and presented the cup.

The Roar
In 2007 the school's newspaper, The Roar, earned first place in the general excellence category at an awards ceremony sponsored by the Gwinnett Daily Post. The staff of The Roar was recognized with the best news section, best layout/design, honorable mention for best sports section, and first place in general excellence.

Winterguard
The Peachtree Ridge Winterguard placed Grand Champions (Division Scholastic AAA) in the Southern Association for Performing Arts Championships in Macon in March 2007.  Schools from five states competed against the PRHS winterguard. This has now passed on to Hull Middle School, Peachtree Ridge's middle school.

NJROTC 
In 2022, the Peachtree Ridge High School NJROTC received 21st place at the 2022 NJROTC Navy Nationals hosted at Pensacola, Naval Air Station, Florida. The "Lions Battalion" beat countless other highly ranked NJROTC programs and received a 3rd place trophy for the shuttle run event.

Athletics
Since 2004, Peachtree Ridge has competed in Region 7-AAAAAA.

Notable alumni 
 Orlando Brown Jr., NFL football player
 Drew Butler, NFL football player
 Zach Graham, NBB basketball player
 Cameron Heyward, NFL football player
 Connor Heyward, NFL football player
 Kevin Minter, NFL football player
 Nick Neidert, MLB baseball player
 Bradley Roby, NFL football player
 Devin Vassell, NBA basketball player
 Jared Walsh, MLB baseball player
 Nigel Warrior, NFL football player
 Romello White, ISBL basketball player

References

External links
Peachtree Ridge High School
Robotics Team
Peachtree Ridge Roaring Lions Marching Band
Peachtree Ridge Football
Peachtree Ridge Hockey
Gwinnett County Public Schools

Educational institutions established in 2003
Public high schools in Georgia (U.S. state)
Schools in Gwinnett County, Georgia
2003 establishments in Georgia (U.S. state)